Lady Libertine (also known as Frank and I) is a 1984 soft-core erotic film by Gérard Kikoïne. This Playboy production, released theatrically in Europe and on television in the US, is an adaptation of the Victorian novel (1902) Frank and I by Bill Adler.  French actress turned famous TV host  unsuccessfully sued to stop its release.

Gérard Kikoïne had quite a large budget for this film and was assisted by French set designer Jean-Charles Dedieu. Therefore production values are quite good, especially since they involve many period costumes and sets. Jennifer Inch is playing the role of Frank, the orphan boy, and of Frances. Sophie Favier plays the role of the mistress of Charles de Beaumont.

Plot
In the 1880s, a rich nobleman from London, Charles de Beaumont (Christopher Pearson), meets "Frank", an adolescent, and offers hospitality to the young orphan. According to the usages of his caste, he decides to educate him by himself. But Frank is not an obedient pupil and Charles is surprised when he discovers that Frank is not a boy as he believed, but a beautiful young girl named Frances with a dark secret.

References

External links 
 
 

1984 films
1980s English-language films
1984 romantic drama films
British erotic drama films
Films based on British novels
Films set in the 19th century
Films set in the 1880s
Films set in the Victorian era
BDSM in films
Juvenile sexuality in films
1980s erotic drama films
1980s British films